The town of Mullanpur Dakha, also known as Mandi Mullanpur, is located in the Ludhiana district in the Indian state of Punjab. It is a nagar panchayat, a settlement in transition from rural to urban. Due to the availability of transport routes to other villages, the town serves as a marketplace of grain and other goods to the surrounding area.

Demographics
According to census data from 2011, Mullanpur Dakha had a population of 16,356. Males constituted 8,595 of the population and females constituted 7,761.  Mullanpur Dakha has a literacy rate of 79.41%, somewhat above the national average of 74.04%.

Transportation
Mullanpur is located on National Highway 5 (NH 5). It has bus services to Bathinda, Moga, and Ludhiana. Nearby villages include Jangpur, Issewal, Mullanpur, Bhanohar, Raqba, Pandori, Rurka, Dakha, Kailpur, Braich and Mohie.

Markets and colonies
Meena Bazaar is the main market in Mullanpur. 

Health services are provided by Hospital S. Hari, Saran hospital , and Ashmeen Medicos in main chowk Mullanpur.

Colonies Oldest one in mullanpur is Purani Mandi and other include Bank Colony, Link Road, Harnek Nagar, S. Bhagat Singh Nagar,Harnam City Jangpur Road and Dashmesh Nagar.

Education
The major local educational institutions are senior secondary schools: Guru Nanak Public School, Mullanpur, Guru Teg Bahadur National Public Senior Secondary School, Dakha (also known as GTB School, Dakha, Eastwood International School, Mullanpur, and Peace Public School, Bhanohar. Some colleges in the area are Guru Teg Bahadur National College, Dakha (also known as 'GTB National College, Dakha' and 'Dakha College'), Guru Teg Bahadur National Institute of Management and Technology, Dakha (also known as GTBIMT, Dakha), PCTE Group of Institutes, Baddowal, Ludhiana Group of Colleges, Chowkiman,  Bajaj College, Chowkiman, and Guru Hargobind Khalsa College, Gurusar Sadhar (also known as 'Sadhar College').

Trusts and gurdwaras
Gurmat Bhawan is the main and most popular trust in Mullanpur, helping to educate poor and handicapped children.

The most famous gurdwara – a place of worship for Sikhs – in Mullanpur is Gurdwara Mashkiana Sahib.  It is a place of great historical significance. Other Gurdwaras include Sri Guru Hargobind Sahib, Gurdwara Singh Sabha Sahib and Gurudwara Baba Vishwkarma. Nirankari Bhawan is also located near Pandori Nursing Home at Jagraon Road.

Medical Facilities
Punjab Medical Hall Ludhiana Road, Dhaliwal Medical Raikot Road and Ashmeen Medicos are the famous chemist shops in the city, located in main chowk, opposite Raikot Road, Near Akal foto studio.

References

Cities and towns in Ludhiana district